Studies in Second Language Acquisition is a peer-reviewed journal published quarterly by Cambridge University Press. The editors for 2008 were Albert Valdman of Indiana University and Susan Gass of Michigan State University.

According to the Journal Citation Reports, the journal has a 2016 impact factor of 2.044.

See also 
 Second language acquisition

References

External links 
 Studies in Second Language Acquisition — official journal page at publisher's website

Linguistics journals
Cambridge University Press academic journals
Quarterly journals
English-language journals
Publications established in 1978